Extraños caminos del amor (English: Strange ways of love) is a Mexican telenovela produced by Ernesto Alonso for Televisa in 1981. Helena Rojo, Alfredo Leal, and José Roberto starred as protagonists.

Plot 
Isabella is a shy young man who has dedicated his life to caring for her sick mother. One day, in the Church, currency and immediately a man realizes that he has reached her prince. The man is businessman Samuel War and also attracted to the quiet woman. Overwhelmed by the death of his mother Isabella impulsively accepts the proposal of marriage of Samuel and marries ignoring the past and the strange family of her husband.

Cast 
 Helena Rojo as Isabella
 José Roberto as Carlos Guerra
 Alfredo Leal as Samuel Guerra
 Magda Guzmán as Antonia Guerra
 René Casados as Miguel Guerra
 Angélica Chain as Olga
 Antonio Valencia as Vicente Sotomayor
 Gastón Tuset as Ernesto
 Lucy Tovar as Irene
 Jorge del Campo as Víctor
 Gloria Mayo as Sofía
 Bertha Moss as Gertrudis
 Daniel Lago as Enrique
 Sergio Goyri as Álvaro
 Angelita Castany as Rosario
 Queta Lavat as Jacinta
 Alberto Inzúaas Múñoz
 Consuelo Frank as Elisa
 Maribel Fernández as Alicia
 Enrique del Castillo as Porfirio

References

External links 

Mexican telenovelas
1981 telenovelas
Televisa telenovelas
Spanish-language telenovelas
1981 Mexican television series debuts
1982 Mexican television series endings